Constructivism is a view in the philosophy of science that maintains that scientific knowledge is constructed by the scientific community, which seeks to measure and construct models of the natural world. According to the constructivist, natural science, therefore, consists of mental constructs that aim to explain sensory experience and measurements.

According to constructivists, the world is independent of human minds, but knowledge of the world is always a human and social construction. Constructivism opposes the philosophy of objectivism, embracing the belief that a human can come to know the truth about the natural world not mediated by scientific approximations with different degrees of validity and accuracy.

According to constructivists, there is no single valid methodology in science but rather a diversity of useful methods.

Etymology
The term originates from psychology, education, and social constructivism.  The expression "constructivist epistemology" was first used by Jean Piaget, 1967, with plural form in the famous article from the "Encyclopédie de la Pléiade" Logique et connaissance scientifique or "Logic and Scientific knowledge", an important text for epistemology. He refers directly to the mathematician Brouwer and his radical constructivism.

The terms Constructionism and constructivism are often, but should not be, used interchangeably.  Constructionism is an approach to learning that was developed by Papert; the approach was greatly influenced by his work with Piaget, but it is very different. Constructionism involves the creation of a product to show learning.  It is believed by constructivists that race, sexuality, and gender, as well as tables, chairs, and atoms, are socially constructed.

History
Constructivism stems from a number of philosophies. For instance, early development can be attributed to the thought of Greek philosophers such as Heraclitus (Everything flows, nothing stands still), Protagoras (Man is the measure of all things). Protagoras is clearly represented by Plato and hence the tradition as a relativist. The Pyrrhonist skeptics have also been so interpreted. (Although this is more contentious.)

Following the Renaissance and the Enlightenment, with the phenomenology and the event, Kant gives a decisive contradiction to Cartesians' epistemology that has grown since Descartes despite Giambattista Vico calling in Scienza nuova ("New Science") in 1725 that "the norm of the truth is to have made it". The Enlightenment's claim of the universality of Reason as the only true source of knowledge generated a Romantic reaction involving an emphasis on the separate natures of races, species, sexes, and types of human.

 Gaston Bachelard, who is known for his physics psychoanalysis and the definition of an "epistemologic obstacle" that can disturb a changing of scientific paradigm as the one that occurred between classical mechanics and Einstein's relativism, opens the teleological way with "The meditation on the object takes the form of the project". In the following famous saying, he insists that the ways in which questions are posed determine the trajectory of scientific movement, before summarizing "nothing is given, all is constructed": "And, irrespective of what one might assume, in the life of a science, problems do not arise by themselves. It is precisely this that marks out a problem as being of the true scientific spirit: all knowledge is in response to a question. If there were no questions, there would be no scientific knowledge. Nothing proceeds from itself. Nothing is given. All is constructed.", Gaston Bachelard (La formation de l'esprit scientifique, 1934). While quantum mechanics is starting to grow, Gaston Bachelard makes a call for new science in Le nouvel esprit scientifique (The New Scientific Spirit).
 Paul Valéry, a French poet (20th century) reminds us of the importance of representations and action: "We have always sought explanations when it was only representations that we could seek to invent", "My hand feels touched as well as it touches; reality says this, and nothing more".
 This link with action, which could be called a "philosophy of action", was well represented by Spanish poet Antonio Machado: Caminante, no hay camino, se hace camino al andar. ("Traveler, there is no road; you make your own path as you walk.")
 Ludwik Fleck establishes scientific constructivism by introducing the notions of thought collective (Denkkollektiv), and thought style (Denkstil), through which the evolution of science is much more understandable because the research objects can be described in terms of the assumptions (thought style) that are shared for practical but also inherently social reasons, or just because any thought collective tends to preserve itself. These notions have been drawn upon by Thomas Kuhn.
 Norbert Wiener gives another defense of teleology in 1943 Behavior, Intention and Teleology and is one of the creators of cybernetics.
 Jean Piaget, after the creation in 1955 of the International Centre for Genetic Epistemology in Geneva, first uses the expression "constructivist epistemologies" (see above). According to Ernst von Glasersfeld, Jean Piaget is "the great pioneer of the constructivist theory of knowing" (in An Exposition of Constructivism: Why Some Like it Radical, 1990) and "the most prolific constructivist in our century" (in Aspects of Radical Constructivism, 1996).
 J. L. Austin is associated with the view that speech is not only passively describing a given reality, but it can change the (social) reality to which it is applied through speech acts.
 Herbert A. Simon called "the sciences of the artificial" these new sciences (cybernetics, cognitive sciences, decision and organization sciences) that, because of the abstraction of their object (information, communication, decision), cannot match with the classical epistemology and its experimental method and refutability.
 Gregory Bateson and his book Steps to an Ecology of Mind (1972).
 George Kelly (psychologist) and his book The Psychology of Personal Constructs  (1955).
 Heinz von Foerster, invited by Jean Piaget, presented "Objects: tokens for (Eigen-)behaviors" in 1976 in Geneva at a genetic epistemology symposium, a text that would become a reference for constructivist epistemology.  His epistemological arguments were summarized in the book The Dream of Reality by Lynn Segal.
 Paul Watzlawick, who supervised in 1984 the publication of The Invented Reality: How Do We Know What We Believe We Know? (Contributions to Constructivism).
 Ernst von Glasersfeld, has promoted since the end of the 70s radical constructivism (see below).
 Edgar Morin and his book La méthode (1977–2004, six volumes).
 Mioara Mugur-Schächter is also a quantum mechanics specialist.
 Jean-Louis Le Moigne for his encyclopedic work on constructivist epistemology and his General Systems theory (see "Le Moigne's Defense of Constructivism" by Ernst von Glasersfeld).
 Niklas Luhmann who developed "operative constructivism" in the course of developing his theory of autopoietic social systems, drawing on the works of (among others) Bachelard, Valéry, Bateson, von Foerster, von Glasersfeld, and Morin.

Constructivism and sciences

Social constructivism in sociology

One version of social constructivism contends that categories of knowledge and reality are actively created by social relationships and interactions. These interactions also alter the way in which scientific episteme is organized.

Social activity presupposes human interaction, and in the case of social construction, utilizing semiotic resources (meaning-making and signifying) with reference to social structures and institutions. Several traditions use the term Social Constructivism: psychology (after Lev Vygotsky), sociology (after  Peter Berger and Thomas Luckmann, themselves influenced by Alfred Schütz), sociology of knowledge (David Bloor), sociology of mathematics (Sal Restivo), philosophy of mathematics (Paul Ernest). Ludwig Wittgenstein's later philosophy can be seen as a foundation for social constructivism, with its key theoretical concepts of language games embedded in forms of life.

Constructivism in philosophy of science
Thomas Kuhn argued that changes in scientists' views of reality not only contain subjective elements but result from group dynamics, "revolutions" in scientific practice, and changes in "paradigms". As an example, Kuhn suggested that the Sun-centric Copernican "revolution" replaced the Earth-centric views of Ptolemy not because of empirical failures but because of a new "paradigm" that exerted control over what scientists felt to be the more fruitful way to pursue their goals.

The view of reality as accessible only through models was called model-dependent realism by Stephen Hawking and Leonard Mlodinow. While not rejecting an independent reality, model-dependent realism says that we can know only an approximation of it provided by the intermediary of models.
These models evolve over time as guided by scientific inspiration and experiments.

In the field of the social sciences, constructivism as an epistemology urges that researchers reflect upon the paradigms that may be underpinning their research, and in the light of this that they become more open to considering other ways of interpreting any results of the research. Furthermore, the focus is on presenting results as negotiable constructs rather than as models that aim to "represent" social realities more or less accurately. Norma Romm, in her book Accountability in Social Research (2001), argues that social researchers can earn trust from participants and wider audiences insofar as they adopt this orientation and invite inputs from others regarding their inquiry practices and the results thereof.

Constructivism and psychology

In psychology, constructivism refers to many schools of thought that, though extraordinarily different in their techniques (applied in fields such as education and psychotherapy), are all connected by a common critique of previous standard objectivist approaches. Constructivist psychology schools share assumptions about the active constructive nature of human knowledge. In particular, the critique is aimed at the "associationist" postulate of empiricism, "by which the mind is conceived as a passive system that gathers its contents from its environment and, through the act of knowing, produces a copy of the order of reality."

In contrast, "constructivism is an epistemological premise grounded on the assertion that, in the act of knowing, it is the human mind that actively gives meaning and order to that reality to which it is responding".
The constructivist psychologies theorize about and investigate how human beings create systems for meaningfully understanding their worlds and experiences.

Constructivism and education

Joe L. Kincheloe has published numerous social and educational books on critical constructivism (2001, 2005, 2008), a version of constructivist epistemology that places emphasis on the exaggerated influence of political and cultural power in the construction of knowledge, consciousness, and views of reality. In the contemporary mediated electronic era, Kincheloe argues, dominant modes of power have never exerted such influence on human affairs. Coming from a critical pedagogical perspective, Kincheloe argues that understanding a critical constructivist epistemology is central to becoming an educated person and to the institution of just social change.

Kincheloe's characteristics of critical constructivism:

Knowledge is socially constructed: World and information co-construct one another
Consciousness is a social construction
Political struggles: Power plays an exaggerated role in the production of knowledge and consciousness
The necessity of understanding consciousness—even though it does not lend itself to traditional reductionistic modes of measurability
The importance of uniting logic and emotion in the process of knowledge and producing knowledge
The inseparability of the knower and the known
The centrality of the perspectives of oppressed peoples—the value of the insights of those who have suffered as the result of existing social arrangements
The existence of multiple realities: Making sense of a world far more complex than we originally imagined
Becoming humble knowledge workers: Understanding our location in the tangled web of reality
Standpoint epistemology: Locating ourselves in the web of reality, we are better equipped to produce our own knowledge
Constructing practical knowledge for critical social action
Complexity: Overcoming reductionism
Knowledge is always entrenched in a larger process
The centrality of interpretation: Critical hermeneutics
The new frontier of classroom knowledge: Personal experiences intersecting with pluriversal information
Constructing new ways of being human: Critical ontology

Constructivist approaches

Critical constructivism
A series of articles published in the journal Critical Inquiry (1991) served as a manifesto for the movement of critical constructivism in various disciplines, including the natural sciences.   Not only truth and reality, but also "evidence", "document", "experience", "fact", "proof", and other central categories of empirical research (in physics, biology, statistics, history, law, etc.) reveal their contingent character as a social and ideological construction. Thus, a "realist" or "rationalist" interpretation is subjected to criticism.  Kincheloe's political and pedagogical notion (above) has emerged as a central articulation of the concept.

Cultural constructivism
Cultural constructivism asserts that knowledge and reality are a product of their cultural context, meaning that two independent cultures will likely form different observational methodologies.

Genetic epistemology

James Mark Baldwin invented this expression, which was later popularized by Jean Piaget. From 1955 to 1980, Piaget was Director of the International Centre for Genetic Epistemology in Geneva.

Radical constructivism

Ernst von Glasersfeld was a prominent proponent of radical constructivism. This claims that knowledge is not a commodity that is transported from one mind into another. Rather, it is up to the individual to "link up" specific interpretations of experiences and ideas with their own reference of what is possible and viable. That is, the process of constructing knowledge, of understanding, is dependent on the individual's subjective interpretation of their active experience, not what "actually" occurs. Understanding and acting are seen by radical constructivists not as dualistic processes but "circularly conjoined".

Radical constructivism is closely related to second-order cybernetics.

Constructivist Foundations is a free online journal publishing peer-reviewed articles on radical constructivism by researchers from multiple domains.

Relational constructivism

Relational constructivism can be perceived as a relational consequence of radical constructivism. In contrary to social constructivism, it picks up the epistemological threads. It maintains the radical constructivist idea that humans cannot overcome their limited conditions of reception (i.e., self-referentially operating cognition). Therefore, humans are not able to come to objective conclusions about the world.

In spite of the subjectivity of human constructions of reality, relational constructivism focuses on the relational conditions applying to human perceptional processes. Björn Kraus puts it in a nutshell:

Social Constructivism

Criticisms
Numerous criticisms have been levelled at Constructivism. The most common one is that it either explicitly advocates or implicitly reduces to relativism.

Another criticism of constructivism is that it holds that the concepts of two different social formations be entirely different and incommensurate. This being the case, it is impossible to make comparative judgments about statements made according to each worldview. This is because the criteria of judgment will themselves have to be based on some worldview or other. If this is the case, then it brings into question how communication between them about the truth or falsity of any given statement could be established.

The Wittgensteinian philosopher Gavin Kitching argues that constructivists usually implicitly presuppose a deterministic view of language, which severely constrains the minds and use of words by members of societies: they are not just "constructed" by language on this view but are literally "determined" by it. Kitching notes the contradiction here: somehow, the advocate of constructivism is not similarly constrained. While other individuals are controlled by the dominant concepts of society, the advocate of constructivism can transcend these concepts and see through them.

See also

 Autopoiesis
 Consensus reality
 Constructivism in international relations
 Cultural pluralism
 Epistemological pluralism
 Tinkerbell effect
 Map–territory relation
 Meaning making
 Metacognition
 Ontological pluralism
 Personal construct psychology
 Perspectivism
 Pragmatism

References

Further reading
 Devitt, M. 1997. Realism and Truth, Princeton University Press.
 Gillett, E. 1998. "Relativism and the Social-constructivist Paradigm", Philosophy, Psychiatry, & Psychology, Vol.5, No.1, pp. 37–48
 Ernst von Glasersfeld 1987. The construction of knowledge, Contributions to conceptual semantics.
 Ernst von Glasersfeld 1995. Radical constructivism: A way of knowing and learning.
 Joe L. Kincheloe 2001. Getting beyond the Facts: Teaching Social Studies/Social Science in the Twenty-First Century, NY: Peter Lang.
 Joe L. Kincheloe 2005. Critical Constructivism Primer, NY: Peter Lang.
 Joe L. Kincheloe 2008. Knowledge and Critical Pedagogy, Dordrecht, The Netherlands: Springer.
 Kitching, G. 2008. The Trouble with Theory: The Educational Costs of Postmodernism, Penn State University Press.
 Björn Kraus 2014: Introducing a model for analyzing the possibilities of power, help and control. In: Social Work and Society. International Online Journal. Retrieved 3 April 2019.(http://www.socwork.net/sws/article/view/393)
 Björn Kraus 2015: The Life We Live and the Life We Experience: Introducing the Epistemological Difference between "Lifeworld" (Lebenswelt) and "Life Conditions" (Lebenslage). In: Social Work and Society. International Online Journal. Retrieved 27 August 2018.(http://www.socwork.net/sws/article/view/438).
 Björn Kraus 2019: Relational constructivism and relational social work. In: Webb, Stephen, A. (edt.) The Routledge Handbook of Critical Social Work. Routledge international Handbooks. London and New York: Taylor & Francis Ltd. 
 Friedrich Kratochwil: Constructivism: what it is (not) and how it matters, in Donatella della Porta & Michael Keating (eds.) 2008, Approaches and Methodologies in the Social Sciences: A Pluralist Perspective, Cambridge University Press, 80–98.
 Mariyani-Squire, E. 1999. "Social Constructivism: A flawed Debate over Conceptual Foundations", Capitalism, Nature, Socialism, vol.10, no.4, pp. 97–125
 Matthews, M.R. (ed.) 1998. Constructivism in Science Education: A Philosophical Examination, Kluwer Academic Publishers.
 Edgar Morin 1986, La Méthode,  Tome 3, La Connaissance de la connaissance.
 Nola, R. 1997. "Constructivism in Science and in Science Education: A Philosophical Critique", Science & Education, Vol.6, no.1-2, pp. 55–83.
 Jean Piaget (ed.) 1967. Logique et connaissance scientifique, Encyclopédie de la Pléiade, vol. 22. Editions Gallimard.
 Herbert A. Simon 1969. The Sciences of the Artificial (3rd Edition MIT Press 1996).
 Slezak, P. 2000. "A Critique of Radical Social Constructivism", in D.C. Philips, (ed.) 2000, Constructivism in Education: Opinions and Second Opinions on Controversial Issues, The University of Chicago Press.
 Suchting, W.A. 1992. "Constructivism Deconstructed", Science & Education, vol.1, no.3, pp. 223–254
 Paul Watzlawick 1984. The Invented Reality: How Do We Know What We Believe We Know? (Contributions to Constructivism), W W. Norton.
 Tom Rockmore 2008. On Constructivist Epistemology.
 Romm, N.R.A. 2001. Accountability in Social Research, Dordrecht, The Netherlands: Springer. https://www.springer.com/social+sciences/book/978-0-306-46564-2

External links

 Journal of Constructivist Psychology
 Radical Constructivism
 Constructivist Foundations

Epistemological theories
Epistemology of science
Metatheory of science
Philosophical analogies
Social constructionism
Social epistemology
Systems theory
Theories of truth